Lytle High School is a public high school located in Lytle, Texas (USA) and classified as a 3A school by the UIL. It is part of the Lytle Independent School District located in extreme northwest Atascosa County. In 2015, the school was rated "Met Standard" by the Texas Education Agency.

Academics
UIL Academic Meet Champions 
1991(2A)

Athletics
The Lytle Pirates compete in these sports - 

Baseball
Basketball
Cross Country
Football
Golf
Softball
Tennis
Track and Field
Volleyball

State Titles
Boys Cross Country - 
2013(3A), 2022(3A)

References

External links
 

Schools in Atascosa County, Texas
Public high schools in Texas